Tenebroides corticalis is a species of bark-gnawing beetle in the family Trogossitidae. It is found in North America.

References

Further reading

External links

 

Trogossitidae